James Edward Cheek (December 4, 1932 – January 8, 2010) was president emeritus of Howard University. He was born in Roanoke Rapids, North Carolina.

Howard University President (1968–1989)
In 1989, Cheek appointed Republican National Committee Chairman Lee Atwater as a member of the Howard University Board of Trustees. Students rose up in protest against Atwater's appointment, disrupting Howard's 122nd anniversary celebrations, and eventually occupied the university's administration building. Within days, both Atwater and Cheek resigned.

Personal life
Cheek was married to the former Celestine Williams, and had two children. He died on January 8, 2010, from complications of coronary artery disease and chronic obstructive pulmonary disease.

References

External links
 Shaw University Learning Resources Center Named in Honor of James E. Cheek
 

1932 births
2010 deaths
American theologians
Presidents of Howard University
African-American United States Air Force personnel
Presidential Medal of Freedom recipients
United States Air Force personnel of the Korean War
Shaw University alumni
Drew University alumni
Colgate Rochester Crozer Divinity School faculty
People from Roanoke Rapids, North Carolina